Psapharomys is a genus of flies in the family Stratiomyidae.

Species
Psapharomys salebrosa Grünberg, 1915

References

Stratiomyidae
Brachycera genera
Taxa named by Karl Grünberg
Diptera of Africa